The canton of Grandvillars is an administrative division of the Territoire de Belfort department, northeastern France. Its borders were modified at the French canton reorganisation which came into effect in March 2015. Its seat is in Grandvillars.

It consists of the following communes:

Angeot
Autrechêne
Bessoncourt
Bethonvilliers
Boron
Brebotte
Bretagne
Chavanatte
Chavannes-les-Grands
Cunelières
Eguenigue
Fontaine
Fontenelle
Foussemagne
Frais
Froidefontaine 
Grandvillars
Grosne
Lacollonge
Lagrange
Larivière
Menoncourt
Méziré
Montreux-Château
Morvillars
Novillard
Petit-Croix
Phaffans
Recouvrance
Reppe
Suarce
Vauthiermont
Vellescot

References

Cantons of the Territoire de Belfort